The Rhythm Sisters is an English acoustic/pop duo from Leeds which formed in 1987. The same year, they released the album Road to Roundhay Pier. Sisters Mandi and Debi Laek released their first single, "American Boys", which reached number seven on the UK Independent Chart, while touring extensively in the UK and Europe with The Proclaimers. They have used various session musicians and their lineups have included Bruce Foxton from The Jam, Bill Nelson from Be-Bop Deluxe, Chris Bostock from JoBoxers and drummer Steve J Jones, who had worked with a number of artists, including the UK Subs. In 1990, they worked with Nelson on the album Willerby, released the following year.

Discography

Albums
 Road to Roundhay Pier (1987, Red Rhino) - UK Indie #19
 Willerby (1991, Imaginary)
 Tell Me How Long the Boat's Been Gone (2007, Radio Geronimo)

Singles
 "American Boys" (1987, Oval Records) - UK Indie #7
 "Infotainment" (1991, Imaginary)

References

External links

MySpace site
http://www.leedsmusicscene.net/article/6869/
https://www.youtube.com/watch?v=g37M8DhxrjM
https://web.archive.org/web/20070928015911/http://www.billnelsonmusic.com/usarchives/discography/session.htm

English folk musical groups
English pop music duos
Folk music duos
Sibling musical duos
Female musical duos
Imaginary Records artists
Musical groups from Leeds
Musical groups established in 1987